The Rauflihorn (also known as Blutlighorn) is a mountain of the Bernese Alps, located east of St. Stephan in the Bernese Oberland, Switzerland.

Borders
It lies east of the Spillgerte, on the range that separates the valley of Diemtigen from the Simmental.

References

External links
 Rauflihorn on Hikr

Mountains of the Alps
Mountains of Switzerland
Mountains of the canton of Bern
Two-thousanders of Switzerland